The unicursal hexagram is a hexagram or six-pointed star that can be traced or drawn unicursally, in one continuous line rather than by two overlaid triangles. The hexagram can also be depicted inside a circle with the points touching it. It is often depicted in an interlaced form with the lines of the hexagram passing over and under one another to form a knot. It is a specific instance of the far more general shape discussed in Blaise Pascal's 1639 Hexagrammum Mysticum Theorem.

Giordano Bruno and the Hermetic Trinity in his mathesis 
In his work titled Essays Upon the Mathematics of Mordente: One Hundred and Sixty Theses/Articles Against the Mathematicians and Philosophers of this Age, Italian-Dominican cosmotical theorist, Hermetic occultist, mathematician and philosophist Giordano Bruno used the unicursal hexagram symbol to represent Figura Amoris ("figure of love") part of the Hermetic Trinity in his mathesis.

Thelema 

In Aleister Crowley's Thelema, the hexagram is usually depicted with a five-petalled flower in the centre which symbolises a pentacle. The symbol itself is the equivalent of the ancient Egyptian Ankh, or the Rosicrucian's Rose Cross; which represents the microcosmic forces (the pentacle, representation of the pentagram with 5 elements, the Pentagrammaton, YHSVH or Yahshuah) interweave with the macro-cosmic forces (the hexagram, the representation of the planetary or heavenly cosmic forces, the divine).

In popular culture 
 The unicursal hexagram appears during the end credits of every episode of the television series Loki shown as one of the symbols of the Time Variance Authority (TVA).
 The unicursal hexagram was part of the symbol called "The Seal of Orichalcos" that was prominent in Yu-Gi-Oh! Waking the Dragons.
 The unicursal hexagram is used in the series A Certain Magical Index to summon an Angel capable of erasing the memories of the Nun that was used as an Index of prohibited books, to keep her under the control of the church.
 A unicursal hexagram called the "Aquarian Star" appears several times in the television series Supernatural as the logo of an organization called Men of Letters. It was also featured prominently in the season 8 episode "As Time Goes By" as the symbol signifying membership of the Men of Letters. It's mentioned that it stands above the gates to Atlantis.
 A modified version of the symbol appears on the cover of Mindless Self Indulgence's fifth studio album How I Learned to Stop Giving a Shit and Love Mindless Self Indulgence.
 Serves as a symbol of the Inferno faction in Heroes of Might and Magic V.
 Commonly used by the UK band Bring Me the Horizon since their release of Sempiternal in 2013 (also referred to as "Antivist-symbol"). It is now often used as a symbol or logo for the band.
 The unicursal hexagram has been used by the band Behemoth as a part of the stage props for their live performances.
 The unicursal hexagram was also used by the Ordre Martiniste founded in France in 1884. Early 1880s patents of that order show the unicursal hexagram in an engraving on the side of a symbolic cube located near the bottom left of each 19th century diploma/patent of the Papus' Martinist Order.
 Seen in the popular video game Uncharted 3 on the loading screen.
 The unicursal hexagram appears on the flag and symbols of Toyota, Aichi, Japan.
 The unicursal hexagram has appeared on the drum heads of musician Danny Carey during performances of the band Tool.
 The unicursal hexagram is the main symbol of the webcomic The Hues. Creator Alex Heberling said she chose the symbol as it "had a sort of mystical flavor to it" but wasn't from any particular culture or occult practice.
 The fictional metal band Dream Widow uses the hexagram as an album cover in the movie Studio 666 starring the Foo Fighters, and the symbol also appears several times in the movie as part of a plot device.
 The unicursal hexagram was used by the Hexagrammaton formations of the pre-heresy Dark Angels legion in Warhammer 40,000.

See also
74 knot
Hexagram

References

Magic symbols
Thelema
Types of polygons